{{Automatic_taxobox
| image = TakamayuUBf.jpg
| image_caption = Anarchias seychellensis'
| taxon = Uropterygiinae
}}

Uropterygiinae is a subfamily of moray eels.

GeneraAnarchias Jordan & Starks, 1906 -- 11 speciesChannomuraena Richardson, 1848 -- 2 speciesCirrimaxilla Chen & Shao, 1995 -- 1 speciesScuticaria Jordan & Snyder, 1901 -- 2 speciesUropterygius'' Rüppell, 1838 -- 20 species

Muraenidae